Rajapaksha Pathirannehelage Upul Mahendra Rajapaksha (born 25 September 1971) is a Sri Lankan politician and Member of Parliament.

Political career

Upul Mahendra was born on 25 September 1971. He entered politics in 2002 by contesting to the local government election and lost the election. But in 2004 he was selected to the divisional council because one member lost his seat due to disciplinary reason. In 2006 and 2011 local government elections he got the highest number of votes in the division and become a chairperson of the divisional council. He was a chairperson of the Attanagalla Divisional Council from 2006 to 2014. In 2014 He contested to the provincial council election and won. He was a member of the Western Provincial Council from 2014 to 2019. He contested the 2015 parliamentary election as one of the United People's Freedom Alliance (UPFA) electoral alliance's candidates in Gampaha District but failed to get elected after coming 10th amongst the UPFA candidates. He contested the 2020 parliamentary election as a Sri Lanka People's Freedom Alliance electoral alliance candidate in Gampaha District and was elected to the Parliament of Sri Lanka.

Electoral history

References

1971 births
Local authority councillors of Sri Lanka
Living people
Members of the 16th Parliament of Sri Lanka
Members of the Western Provincial Council
Sinhalese politicians
Sri Lankan Buddhists
Sri Lanka People's Freedom Alliance politicians
Sri Lanka Podujana Peramuna politicians
United People's Freedom Alliance politicians